Creighton is a settlement in Harry Gwala District Municipality in the KwaZulu-Natal province of South Africa.

Village 35 km northwest of Ixopo. Laid out in 1865, it has been administered by a Health Committee since 1947. It was named after Lady McCullum (née Creighton), wife of Sir Henry McCullum, Governor of Natal from 1901 to 1907. The first murder to take place here on record was that of Richard Butcher in 2008.

References

Populated places in the Dr Nkosazana Dlamini-Zuma Local Municipality
Populated places established in 1865